Yanding-class transport (AP) is the first transport built in the People’s Republic of China (PRC) for the People's Liberation Army Navy (PLAN). A total of 4 ships were completed by Wuchang Shipyard, and all of them were based on fishing trawlers. Powered by a 3D12 diesel engine, all 4 ships served in the East Sea Fleet, and although its successor Danlin-class cargo ship has entered service in the early 1960s, Yanding class ships remained in service until they were finally retired by 1989.

References

Auxiliary ships of the People's Liberation Army Navy
zh:延定級小型运输船